HD 35519 is a giant star in the direction of open cluster Messier 38.  It was once treated as a cluster member, but is now known to be a foreground object.

References

External links
 HR 1794
 Image HD 35519

K-type giants
Auriga (constellation)
Durchmusterung objects
035519
025476
1794